Khoroshyovo is a station on the Moscow Central Circle of the Moscow Metro. The station offers out-of-station transfers to Polezhayevskaya of Tagansko-Krasnopresnenskaya line and Khoroshyovskaya on the Bolshaya Koltsevaya line.

References

External links 

 Хорошёво mkzd.ru

Moscow Metro stations
Railway stations in Russia opened in 2016
Moscow Central Circle stations